Sandhar may refer to:

 Sandhar, Orissa, a village in Anugul district, Orissa, India
 Sandhar, Punjab, a village in Hoshiarpur district, Punjab, India
 Sukhbir Sandhar,  producer of Saka - The Martyrs of Nankana Sahib
 Puneet Sandhar, candidate in 41st British Columbia general election
 Sandhar Jagir, village in Punjab, India